Szolnok-Doboka was an administrative county (comitatus) of the Kingdom of Hungary. Its territory is now in northern Romania (northern Transylvania). The capital of the county was Dés (now Dej, Romania).

Geography

Szolnok-Doboka county shared borders with the Hungarian counties Szilágy, Szatmár, Máramaros, Beszterce-Naszód and Kolozs. The river Someş flowed through the county. Its area was  around 1910.

History
Szolnok-Doboka county was formed in 1876, when Belső-Szolnok county (its center was Dés/Dej), most of Doboka county (its center was Doboka/Dăbâca at first, later Szamosújvár/Gherla) and the eastern part of the Kővárvidék/Chioar district were united.

In 1920, by the Treaty of Trianon, the county became part of Romania, except from 1940 until the end of World War II, when it was returned to Hungary by the Second Vienna Award, with a slightly modified territory. The territory of the county is now divided between the Romanian counties of Cluj (the center and south, a.o. Dej), Maramureș (the north), Bistrița-Năsăud (the east) and Sălaj (the west).

Demographics

Subdivisions

In the early 20th century, the subdivisions of Szolnok-Doboka county were:

Notes

References 

States and territories established in 1940
States and territories disestablished in 1920
States and territories disestablished in 1945
Kingdom of Hungary counties in Transylvania